The 2014 Castrol Edge Gold Coast 600 was a motor race for V8 Supercars. It was the twelfth event of the 2014 International V8 Supercars Championship, held from 24–26 October at the Surfers Paradise Street Circuit on the Gold Coast, Queensland.

Race 31 saw the Tekno Autosports entry of Shane van Gisbergen and Jonathon Webb take the chequered flag after qualifying on pole. Championship leader Jamie Whincup and co-driver Paul Dumbrell came home in second position. Mark Winterbottom originally finished third, but was penalised for bumping into Tim Slade on the final lap. Slade and co-driver Tony D'Alberto were promoted to third.

Whincup and Dumbrell took out Race 32 and the Pirtek Enduro Cup for 2014. Garry Rogers Motorsport's Scott McLaughlin, and Frenchman Alexandre Prémat, came second after starting on pole. The Nissan Altima of Michael Caruso and Dean Fiore rounded out the podium. The second race finished time certain following extended periods of the safety car.

Championship Points
 After 32 of 38 races.

References

External links
Official website
Official series website

Armor All Gold Coast 600
Sport on the Gold Coast, Queensland